Mecodema oregoides is a small-bodied ground beetle endemic to New Zealand, and is the southernmost species of the curvidens group. It is found in a range of different habitats on Banks Peninsula, Canterbury.

References 

oregoides
Taxa named by Thomas Broun
Beetles described in 1894